SOL3 is an American footwear company that designs and produces shoe accessories, which range from manufacturing insoles such as shoe lifts and crease protectors to various basic foot care items including laces, deodorizer, socks and sneaker cleaner. 

Based in Philadelphia and founded as of late-2016, SOL3 launched the original ternary adjustable height insoles that can be modified to increase elevation in footwear from 1 to 2.36 inches. The company first began distributing and shipping product globally in October 2016. As of December 2017, SOL3 sold an estimated 50,000 units of the 3-Level Insole after its first year of operation. In 2018, SOL3 was named “Footwear Accessory of the Year” by Sneakscore.

References

External links
 

Footwear accessories
Companies based in Philadelphia